Mooresville Friends Academy Building is a historic Quaker school building located at Mooresville, Morgan County, Indiana.  It was built in 1860–1861, and is a two-story, rectangular, Greek Revival style brick building with a low gable roof.  It was built as a two-classroom school and later enlarged with an addition in 1867.  It remained in use for educational purposes until 1971.

It was listed on the National Register of Historic Places in 1975.

References

Quaker schools in the United States
School buildings on the National Register of Historic Places in Indiana
Greek Revival architecture in Indiana
School buildings completed in 1861
Buildings and structures in Morgan County, Indiana
National Register of Historic Places in Morgan County, Indiana